Vicente Moreno Peris (born 26 October 1974) is a Spanish former professional footballer who played as a defensive midfielder, currently manager of Saudi Professional League club Al Shabab.

He spent most of his career with Xerez, appearing in 412 official matches and remaining with the club for 11 years. He also coached it for seven months.

Playing career
An unsuccessful Valencia CF youth graduate, Moreno was born in Massanassa, Valencian Community, and he arrived to Xerez CD in 2000–01 after spending one season each with lowly clubs, also in Segunda División B. Helping the Andalusians promote to the Segunda División in his first year, he never played less than 34 matches until 2009.

In the 2008–09 campaign, Moreno was an everpresent figure for Xerez as they achieved a first-ever La Liga promotion. On 13 June 2009, he scored one goal in a 2–1 home win over SD Huesca which certified his team's promotion.

Moreno made his top-tier debut on 30 August 2009 – two months shy of his 35th birthday – playing the full 90 minutes in a 2–0 away loss against RCD Mallorca. He also started in the third match, a 5–0 defeat to Real Madrid in the Santiago Bernabéu Stadium, but eventually lost his importance, with Malian Sidi Keita being preferred; at the end of the season, albeit only in the last round, the side were immediately relegated.

In June 2011, aged nearly 37, Moreno retired from football after one more season with Xerez (28 appearances, three goals). At the time of his retirement he was the player with the most appearances for the club, also having been the only one to have scored for the organisation in all three major levels of Spanish football. He immediately joined the team's coaching staff.

Coaching career
On 5 December 2011, Moreno replaced Juan Merino at the helm of Xerez. He managed to lead the team to the 14th position, ten points above the relegation zone in division two.

Moreno was appointed Gimnàstic de Tarragona manager on 4 November 2013, taking over for the fired Santi Castillejo at the third tier side. On 22 June 2015, after winning promotion, he renewed his contract for a further year.

On 13 June 2016, after finishing third in the regular season and only missing out another promotion in the play-offs, Moreno extended his link until 2018. He announced he was stepping down on 24 December, however, and the club accepted it three days later.

Moreno was presented as manager of RCD Mallorca in the third division on 20 June 2017. He achieved two consecutive promotions in his first two years, both in the play-offs, followed by an instant relegation in the 2019–20 campaign.

Moreno subsequently left the Visit Mallorca Stadium, and joined fellow relegated side RCD Espanyol on a three-year contract in August 2020. They achieved promotion at the first attempt, as champions.

On 28 July 2022, Moreno was appointed at Saudi Professional League club Al Shabab FC on a one-year deal.

Managerial statistics

Honours

Player
Xerez
Segunda División: 2008–09

Manager
Gimnàstic
Segunda División B: 2014–15

Mallorca
Segunda División B: 2017–18
Segunda División play-off winner: 2019

Espanyol
Segunda División: 2020–21

References

External links

1974 births
Living people
People from Horta Sud
Sportspeople from the Province of Valencia
Spanish footballers
Footballers from the Valencian Community
Association football midfielders
La Liga players
Segunda División players
Segunda División B players
Tercera División players
Valencia CF Mestalla footballers
Ontinyent CF players
Xerez CD footballers
Spanish football managers
Segunda División managers
Segunda División B managers
Xerez CD managers
Gimnàstic de Tarragona managers
RCD Mallorca managers
RCD Espanyol managers
Saudi Professional League managers
Al Shabab FC (Riyadh) managers
Spanish expatriate football managers
Expatriate football managers in Saudi Arabia
Spanish expatriate sportspeople in Saudi Arabia